Manhattan Center for Science and Mathematics (abbreviated as MCSM) is a public high school at East 116th Street between Pleasant Avenue and FDR Drive in East Harlem, within Upper Manhattan, New York City.

The school building, which was formerly Benjamin Franklin High School, was designated a New York City landmark by the New York City Landmarks Preservation Commission on May 29, 2018.

History
The precursor of MCSM in the same building, Benjamin Franklin High School opened in 1934 and was sited at 200 Pleasant Avenue, between 114th Street and 116th Street. A long-time principal there was pioneering educational theorist Leonard Covello, the city's first Italian-American principal.

The New York City Board of Education shuttered the school in June 1982 for performance issues and converted the building into a four-year high school, the Manhattan Center for Science and Mathematics, and a grade 6-8 middle school, the Isaac Newton Middle School for Math and Science, effective September 1982.

Description

Like all New York City high schools, admission is by application.  Admission priority for Manhattan Center is given first to students attending the Isaac Newton Junior High School, which shares the campus with Manhattan Center; second to students residing in District 4; and then to other residents citywide.

The academic performance of this school is extremely high, as measured by New York State Regents Examinations scores, scholarship rates and a 95% graduation rate. MCSM is consistently one of the highest performing schools in the State of New York.  In 2007, David Jimenez became the Principal. In 2009, MCSM graduated 97% of its students. Students graduating from Manhattan Center have attended top-notch colleges, including Ivy League colleges.

The curriculum includes Advanced Placement courses and special programs, and research and internship opportunities. The school offers AP World History, AP Art History, AP Macroeconomics, AP US Government, AP US History, AP English Language and Composition, AP English Literature and Composition, AP Calculus AB, AP Calculus BC, AP Physics C, AP Biology, AP Chemistry, AP Statistics, AP Computer Science Principles, AP Spanish Language and Culture and AP Spanish Literature and Culture. There are several honors and accelerated courses.

Manhattan Center partners with institutions of higher education, such as New York University, Columbia University, Cornell and CUNY, to offer courses in science, mathematics and humanities. Through these partnerships and Mount Sinai Hospital, Metropolitan Hospital Center, General Electric, Sponsors for Educational Opportunity, American Globe Theatre, and Manhattan Theatre Club there is a wide range of opportunities for one-on-one mentoring, internship experiences, academic enrichment and summer programs. They also provide support services, and a variety of sports, clubs and leadership activities for students.

Notable alumni

Franklin High:
 Richie Adams (1980)
 Walter Berry (1982)
 Pedro Espada, Jr. (1971)
 Elmo Hope (late 1930s)
 Floyd Layne
 Daniel Patrick Moynihan (1944)
 Richie Parker
 Johnny Rivera
 Sonny Rollins (1947)
 Edward V. Sparer
 Gary Springer (1980)
 Isaac Walthour (1949)
 John Carro (1945)

MCSM:
 Cam'ron
 Damon Dash
 Sanaa Lathan
 Mase
 Mekhi Phifer

References
Notes
lamont tip dog thornton

Sources
 East Harlem school in first graduation - sees dream come alive

External links

 
 Inside Schools –  H.S. 435 Manhattan Center for Science and Mathematics

Public high schools in Manhattan
Science and technology in New York City
1934 establishments in New York City
1982 establishments in New York City
Educational institutions established in 1934
Educational institutions disestablished in 1982
Educational institutions established in 1982
East Harlem
Schools in Harlem